The Vishnya class (NATO reporting name) (also known as the Meridian class), Soviet designation Project 864, are a group of intelligence collection ships built for the Soviet Navy in the 1980s. The ships continue in service with the Russian Navy. The Russian Navy operates seven of these ships.

Design

These ships are large, purpose built ships designed for signals intelligence gathering via an extensive array of sensors. The data could be transmitted to shore via satellite link antennas housed in two large radomes. The ships are armed with two AK-630 close-in weapon systems and SA-N-8 surface-to-air missile (SAM) launchers, for last resort self-defense.

Operations
On September 23, 2012, SSV Viktor Leonov was at dock in Havana. Other ships visited in 2013.

On February 27, 2014, SSV Viktor Leonov docked in Havana’s cruise ship area, the same day Defense Minister Sergei Shoigu announced that Russia would establish permanent bases in Cuba, Vietnam, Nicaragua, Singapore, and the Seychelle islands.

Vasily Tatishchev was deployed to the Eastern Mediterranean Sea on 5 October 2015 to monitor the conflict in Syria.

On January 20, 2015, SSV Viktor Leonov was at dock in Havana.

This is the farthest north the Russian spy vessel has ever ventured, according to US defense officials. CNN later reported that Viktor Leonov, which conducted similar patrols in 2014 and 2015, was off the coast of Delaware, but typically she only travels as far north as Virginia. The ship is based with Russia's Northern Fleet but had stopped over in Cuba before conducting her patrol along the Atlantic Coast and is expected to return there following her latest mission. She was spotted operating off the coast of South Carolina and Georgia in December 2019. The United States Coast Guard at the time published a MSIB alleging unsafe operations being performed in that area, including running without navigation lights, and failing to respond to hails. The ship is outfitted with a variety of high-tech interception equipment and is designed to intercept signals intelligence. The official said that the US Navy was "keeping a close eye on it.".

Ships

See also
 List of ships of the Soviet Navy
 List of ships of Russia by project number

References

External links
 Vishnya class Complete Ship List

Poland–Soviet Union relations
Signals intelligence
Auxiliary ships of the Soviet Navy
Ships built in Gdańsk
Auxiliary surveillance ship classes
Naval ships built in Poland for export